Brittney Davon Reese (born September 9, 1986) is a retired American long jumper, Olympic gold medalist, and a seven-time world champion. Reese is the indoor American record holder in the long jump with a distance of 7.23 meters.

Personal
Born in Inglewood, California, Reese was a 2004 graduate of Gulfport High School in Gulfport, Mississippi, where she became state champion in the long jump and triple jump.  She later attended MGCCC and the University of Mississippi. Reese was a member of the women's basketball team at MGCCC and was recently inducted into their sports Hall of Fame.

Reese has been assistant track and field coach at San Diego Mesa College since 2013.

Career
She was the NCAA Outdoor Champion in long jump in 2007 and 2008. At the Olympics, Reese had the best qualifying jump at 6.87 meters. However, Reese placed fifth in the final, with a jump of 6.76 meters.

On May 24, 2009, in Belém, Reese extended her personal best to 7.06 m (0.7 m/s wind). This brought her to third on the American all-time list, behind Marion Jones and Jackie Joyner-Kersee.

At the 2009 World Athletics Championships, in Berlin, Reese won the long jump title with a jump of 7.10 meters, beating defending champion Tatyana Lebedeva. Reese is the third youngest champion in the history of the event.

At the 2010 IAAF World Indoor Championships, Reese won the gold medal in the long jump with a jump of 6.70 meters.

At the 2011 World Championships in Athletics, Reese successfully retained the gold medal in the long jump with a jump of 6.82 meters.

At the 2012 IAAF World Indoor Championships, Reese successfully retained the gold medal in the long jump with a jump of 7.23 meters. She became the first woman to win back-to-back World indoor titles in the long jump when she landed a 7.23 m last round effort, the longest mark indoors since 1989, a new American record and third on the all-time indoor lists. At the start of the outdoor season she broke Carol Lewis' long-standing meet record at the Mt SAC Relays with a jump of 7.12 m.  That year, she also won the Olympic gold medal, with another jump of 7.12 m.

Reese won her third consecutive long jump world outdoor title at the 2013 World Championships in Moscow with a jump of 7.01m, beating Blessing Okagbare narrowly by 2 cm.

Philanthropy
On November 14, 2011, Reese donated 100 turkeys and her time to various homeless and religious organizations in her community of Gulfport, Mississippi as her way of "giving back" to the community that has supported her throughout her athletic career. She wanted to make Thanksgiving a little easier, in an area where there are few resources for those in need.

On October 26, 2012, in conjunction with the Gulfport School District celebrating "Brittney Reese Day"; Reese created the B. Reese Scholarship which will be awarded annually to 1 male & 1 female student who has been accepted to a 2-year or 4-year college.

On May 21, 2013, the Reese Scholarship was awarded in Baltimore County Public Schools to a deserving student accepted to college or university who participated in the Allied Sports Program, coordinated by the Office of Athletics Director Michael Sye. The 2014 recipient of the scholarship is Bailey Weinkam, a Catonsville High School student that was born hearing impaired. Ms. Weinkam will attend Community College of Baltimore County in Fall 2014.

Major competition record

Personal bests

All information taken from IAAF profile.

References

Further reading

External links

 
 
 
 
 
 
 NBC Olympics Bio
 Ole Miss Sports Profile
 
 World Express Athletic Management

1986 births
Living people
American female long jumpers
Olympic female long jumpers
Athletes (track and field) at the 2008 Summer Olympics
Athletes (track and field) at the 2012 Summer Olympics
Athletes (track and field) at the 2016 Summer Olympics
Athletes (track and field) at the 2020 Summer Olympics
Sportspeople from Gulfport, Mississippi
Track and field athletes from Mississippi
African-American female track and field athletes
Olympic gold medalists for the United States in track and field
Olympic silver medalists for the United States in track and field
World Athletics Championships medalists
Medalists at the 2012 Summer Olympics
Medalists at the 2016 Summer Olympics
Medalists at the 2020 Summer Olympics
Mississippi Gulf Coast Community College alumni
World Athletics Championships athletes for the United States
World Athletics Championships winners
Sportspeople from Inglewood, California
Diamond League winners
USA Outdoor Track and Field Championships winners
USA Indoor Track and Field Championships winners
World Athletics Indoor Championships winners
IAAF World Athletics Final winners
21st-century African-American sportspeople
21st-century African-American women
20th-century African-American people
20th-century African-American women